Blood Incantation is an American death metal band from Denver, Colorado, formed in 2011. The band consists of guitarist and vocalist Paul Riedl, drummer Isaac Faulk, guitarist Morris Kolontyrsky and bassist Jeff Barrett. Their debut album, Starspawn, was released in 2016 through Dark Descent Records and received critical acclaim from music publications such as Decibel and Stereogum.

The band's sound features "a psychedelic take on classic death metal" and melds "technicality with tectonic riffs, cavernous vocals and eerie, Dodsengel-like moments of caustic stillness." On the band's style, Stereogum's Aaron Lariviere wrote: "Screaming leads cut a swath through the churn of atonal rhythm guitars, blending the bright melodicism of late-period Death with the alien tones of Morbid Angel circa Domination." The band's lyrics mainly deal with topics such as space and death.

Band members
 Paul Riedl – guitars, vocals (2011–present)
 Isaac Faulk – drums (2011–present)
 Morris Kolontyrsky – guitars (2012–present)
 Jeff Barrett – fretless bass (2015–present)

Discography

Studio albums
 Starspawn (2016)
 Hidden History of the Human Race (2019)
 Timewave Zero (2022)

EPs 

 Interdimensional Extinction (2015)
 Live Vitrification (2018)

Demos
 Blood Incantation (2013)
 Demo II (2013)
 Astral Spells (2014)

Split Releases
 Spectral Voice / Blood Incantation (2015)

References

External links
 
 Blood Incantation on the Metal Archives

American death metal musical groups
Heavy metal musical groups from Colorado
Musical groups established in 2011
Musical groups from Denver
Musical quartets
2011 establishments in Colorado